Top of the Pops@play (TOTP@play), is a music television programme, that was broadcast on UKTV-owned digital youth entertainment television channel, Play UK. The programme ran daily on weekday afternoons from October 2000 until 2001.

It was a spin-off of the long-running BBC music programme, Top of the Pops, and was one of several Play UK programmes to utilise the TOTP brand. These programmes were able to use the BBC-owned TOTP brand commercially as BBC Worldwide, the BBC's commercial arm, held (and still holds) a 50% stake in the UKTV group of channels. BBC Worldwide also publishes the TOTP magazine.

The programme was broadcast for three hours each weekday afternoon as a live music and entertainment magazine programme, featuring interviews with celebrities, interactive phone-in elements (such as music video requests), competitions, and magazine features. It was similar in style to the rival programme MTV Select, which aired in a similar afternoon timeslot on MTV UK & Ireland.

TOTP@play utilised a number of presenters during its run, including Josie d'Arby, Vernon Kay, Joe Mace and Dermot O'Leary.

See also
 Top of the Pops
 Top of the Pops Reloaded
 TOTP2

References

Top of the Pops
2000s British music television series
2000 British television series debuts
2001 British television series endings
English-language television shows
Play UK original programming
British television spin-offs